Attila Tököli (born 14 May 1976) is a Hungarian former professional footballer who played as a forward.

Honours
Dunaferr SE
 Nemzeti Bajnokság I: 1999–2000
 Nemzeti Bajnokság II Western Group: 1997–98

Ferencváros
 Nemzeti Bajnokság I: 2003–04
 Hungarian Cup: 2002–03, 2003–04
 Hungarian Super Cup: 2004; runner up 2003

Paks
 Hungarian League Cup:; runner-up 2009–10

Kecskemét
 Hungarian Cup: 2010–11

Individual
 Hungarian League top goalscorer: 1999–2000, 2001–02

External links
Attila Tököli at UEFA.com

http://www.hlsz.hu/

1976 births
Living people
Sportspeople from Pécs
Hungarian footballers
Association football forwards
Hungary international footballers
Bundesliga players
2. Bundesliga players
Cypriot First Division players
Pécsi MFC players
Dunaújváros FC players
Ferencvárosi TC footballers
1. FC Köln players
AEL Limassol players
Anorthosis Famagusta F.C. players
Paksi FC players
Kecskeméti TE players
Zalaegerszegi TE players
Nemzeti Bajnokság I players
Hungarian expatriate footballers
Expatriate footballers in Germany
Expatriate footballers in Cyprus
Hungarian expatriate sportspeople in Germany
Hungarian expatriate sportspeople in Cyprus